The Polish Society of Actuaries (PSA) is the association of actuaries in Poland. The society was established in 1991 to resume activities of the Polish Institute of Actuaries founded in 1920. It is a full member of the International Actuarial Association and the Groupe Consultatif.

Membership

The Polish Society of Actuaries offers three types of membership:
 Student
 Associate
 Fellow

External links

Polish Society of Actuaries official website

Actuarial associations